Tricellaria is a genus of bryozoans belonging to the family Candidae.

The genus has almost cosmopolitan distribution.

Species:

Tricellaria aculeata 
Tricellaria aquilina 
Tricellaria arctica 
Tricellaria catalinensis 
Tricellaria circumternata 
Tricellaria dubia 
Tricellaria elongata 
Tricellaria erecta 
Tricellaria gracilis 
Tricellaria inopinata 
Tricellaria longispinosa 
Tricellaria multispinosa 
Tricellaria occidentalis 
Tricellaria porteri 
Tricellaria praescuta 
Tricellaria pribilofi 
Tricellaria scalariformis 
Tricellaria sympodia 
Tricellaria ternata 
Tricellaria varia 
Tricellaria ziczac

References

Bryozoan genera